Thomas Pope (died 1400), from Gloucester, was an English politician.

Family
He married a woman named Lettice, and they had one son. His second wife was named Margery.

Career
He was a Member (MP) of the Parliament of England for Gloucester in 1393 and January 1397.

References

14th-century births
1400 deaths
14th-century English people
People from Gloucester
Members of the Parliament of England (pre-1707) for Gloucester